The 1975 Hong Kong Urban Council election was held on 5 March 1975 for six of the 12 elected seats of the Urban Council of Hong Kong. 10,903 eligible voters cast their votes, higher than any previous election, though still less than a third of registered voters, less than five per cent of those eligible ratepayers, civil servants, professionals and other professions and a much tinier proportion still of the adult population. For the first time polling stations were set up in the New Territories satellite towns in Tsuen Wan, Yuen Long and Tai Po.

Incumbents Elsie Elliott, Hilton Cheong-Leen,  Denny Huang, Wong Pun-cheuk and Cecilia Yeung all retained their seats while Yeung won by a narrow margin. Henry Luk, a 52-year-old outspoken independent, editor of the pro-KMT Chinese-language newspaper Truth Daily, was the only new candidate elected.  Luk had notably campaigned for free democratic elections for the Legislative Council.

Outcome

References

Hong Kong
1975 in Hong Kong
Urban
March 1975 events in Asia
1975 elections in the British Empire